Hojancha is a district of the Hojancha canton, in the Guanacaste province of Costa Rica.

Geography 
Hojancha has an area of  km² and an elevation of  metres.

Villages
Administrative center of the district is the village of Palmira.

Other villages in the district are Ángeles, Comunidad, Paso Tempisque (partly) and San Rafael.

Demographics 

For the 2011 census, Hojancha had a population of  inhabitants.

Transportation

Road transportation 
The district is covered by the following road routes:
 National Route 158
 National Route 902

References 

Districts of Guanacaste Province
Populated places in Guanacaste Province